Celes Chere is a fictional character and protagonist in the video game Final Fantasy VI. She was created by Yoshinori Kitase and was his favorite character in the game. She struggles with allegiances between the Empire and the rebel group the Returners before ultimately siding with the latter. She appears in other Final Fantasy titles, including the Theatrhythm Final Fantasy series and World of Final Fantasy. She has received generally positive reception, praised by critics for being a good female character. Her attempted suicide, struggles with allegiance, and opera scene are cited as among the most significant aspects of Final Fantasy VI.

Concept and creation
Celes' character and story, including her attempted suicide and opera performance, were designed by Yoshinori Kitase, who regarded her as his favorite character in Final Fantasy VI. Her role in the game was limited at first, but this changed later in development. She was the first character players control in the World of Ruin due to not wanting fellow protagonist Terra Branford's story to be given too much emphasis over others. She was a Rune Knight, able to use an ability called Rune. This ability was originally owned by another character named Locke Cole. She was originally meant to feature the "conflicted spy" archetype where she would spy on the protagonists. She was also supposed to be mentally unstable like Final Fantasy VI antagonist Kefka. She was originally depicted being tortured while restrained, but this was changed in the Game Boy Advance port of Final Fantasy VI due to the lack of Computer Entertainment Rating Organization age ratings when Final Fantasy VI was originally released.

Appearances
Celes first appears in Final Fantasy VI as one of the game's protagonists. A former general of the Empire, Celes joined the Returners after being jailed for questioning imperial practices. She becomes particularly close to Returners member Locke Cole. Celes struggles with her allegiance, at turns betraying the Returners and later trying to kill Kefka. She performs at an opera house in order to fill in for a woman who was not able to fill her role. In the second half of the game, Celes awakens from a coma on a deserted island, having been cared for by Cid, another person from the Empire. She discovers that the world had been sent into ruin by Kefka and that he has obtained godlike power to rule the world and that his rule is causing all life to slowly wither away. She attempts to care for Cid, though if players do not do an adequate job feeding him, he passes away. This causes Celes to fall into despair and attempt to kill herself by jumping off a cliff. Whether he lives or dies, she discovers Locke's bandanna, leading her to take a raft Cid had made to find if any of her compatriots had survived. Finding her friends causes her to have hope, and they use an airship to confront Kefka and end his reign.

She later appears as a playable character in the Theatrhythm Final Fantasy series, Final Fantasy Tactics S, and Final Fantasy: Record Keeper. She appears as a supporting character in World of Final Fantasy, where she received her first voice role by Houko Kuwashima and Christina Rose in Japanese and English respectively.

Reception

Celes Chere has received generally positive reception following her appearance in Final Fantasy VI. She was named the 11th best Final Fantasy character by Marc Nix for IGN in 2008, owing to her opera house scene and the memorability of her aria. IGN staff also featured her as one of the best Final Fantasy characters in 2011, where she was praised for her strong sub-plot, her attempts to save Cid, and her opera scene. She is particularly popular as a female character in video games, voted the fifth best female Final Fantasy character by fans. She was also discussed in Nintendojo's roundtable of their favorite female characters, with writer Joshua Johnston praising her, noting that her quest to reunite the protagonists in the second half of the game is her standout moment. Video game developer Robert Boyd included her in his list of the best warrior heroines in Japanese role-playing games. Kimberley Wallace for Game Informer included her in their celebration of female role-playing game characters. They called her one of the game's most memorable characters, praising her admirable strength and her opera scene. GamesRadar+ staff called her one of the most inspirational female video game characters, discussing how her struggle to leave the Empire as well as her betrayal of the Empire made her a more relatable and admirable character.

Richard Eisenbeis for Kotaku discussed how the aria combined with Celes' attempted suicide drove him to tears. Peter Tieryas for Kotaku discussed how Celes' despair and hope during the second portion mirrors the players and how her suicide attempt affects him years after. Alana Hagues for RPGFan discussed how she saw herself in Celes due to going through similar trials and tribulations, particularly Celes losing her allies, the loss of a family member, and her attempted suicide. The relationship between her and Locke was praised as one of the most beautiful subtle romances in video games by Stew Shearer for The Escapist. She has been requested for inclusion in the Dissidia Final Fantasy fighting game series as a playable character by staff of websites including Hardcore Gamer, Electronic Gaming Monthly, and Digitally Downloaded, the latter calling her their favorite character in Final Fantasy VI. Her Amano-designed outfit was featured among the best Final Fantasy outfits by Maddy Myers for Paste Magazine, while Todd Harper for Paste Magazine preferred the Amano design over her in-game artwork. Chad Concelmo for Destructoid also praised her outfit, noting that the bright yellows in it work well with her fair skin.

Not all reception to the character was positive. Writer James Labolokie from Nintendojo felt that Celes relies too much on Cid and Locke to qualify as a character who breaks boundaries. Jef Rouner for the Houston Press was similarly critical of how she was depicted, noting that despite her and Terra's importance and strength, they are frequently "bound and dominated" by men and require their aide. Patrick Holleman observed that much of her personality is implied on what she does not say, and that the opera scene, which he described as one of the game's "cleverest" due to its use of symbolism, gives players the only real insight into her character in the first half of the game. Holleman argued that she is not a brilliant or rounded character because she suffers from a lack of characterization, particularly in the first half of the game, and attributed the developers' decision to have players start with Celes in the World of Ruin to her lack of character and identity.

References

Adoptee characters in video games
Female characters in video games
Fictional attempted suicides
Fictional child soldiers
Fictional defectors
Fictional female generals
Fictional knights in video games
Fictional revolutionaries
Fictional super soldiers
Fictional witches
Final Fantasy characters
Final Fantasy VI
Genetically engineered characters in video games
Square Enix protagonists
Teenage characters in video games
Video game characters introduced in 1994
Video game characters who use magic
Woman soldier and warrior characters in video games